Avasi Grammar School is a school in Miskolc in the north east of Hungary. It is mostly a bilingual high school which is attended by about 800 pupils and more than 60 teaching staff. The name comes from the Avas Hill where the school is located. Avasi Grammar School was established in 1987.

External links 
 Avasi Grammar School

Schools in Hungary
Educational institutions established in 1987
1987 establishments in Hungary